Fort Mose, originally known as Gracia Real de Santa Teresa de Mose (Royal Grace of Saint Teresa of Mose), and later as Fort Mose, or alternatively, Fort Moosa or Fort Mossa, is a former Spanish fort in St. Augustine, Florida. In 1738, the governor of Spanish Florida, Manuel de Montiano, had the fort established as a free black settlement, the first to be legally sanctioned in what would become the territory of the United States. It was designated a US National Historic Landmark on October 12, 1994.

Fort Mose Historic State Park, which now includes a visitors' center and small museum, is located on the edge of a salt marsh on the western side of the waterway separating the mainland from the coastal barrier islands. The original site of the 18th-century fort was uncovered in a 1986 archeological dig. The  site is now protected as a Florida state park, administered through the Anastasia State Recreation Area. Fort Mose is the "premier site on the Florida Black Heritage Trail".

In 2022, the Florida State Parks Foundation was awarded a grant from the Florida African American Cultural and Historical Grants Program to reconstruct the fort for historic purposes. Additional funds were raised from a jazz concert held shortly before the announcement.

Fort Mose has become a venue for outdoor concerts. Another blues concert was held in February 2023.

Colonial history

Background 
As early as 1689, the colonial authorities of Spanish Florida had begun to offer asylum to escaped slaves fleeing from the Virginia Colony. One particular place of interest was St. Augustine, where the Spanish had established Mission Nombre de Dios with the help of Afro-Spanish slaves and settlers in the late 16th century.

In 1693, King Charles II of Spain issued a royal decree proclaiming that runaways would be granted asylum in Florida in return for converting to Catholicism, which required baptism with Christian names, and serving for four years in the colonial militia. By 1742 the community had grown into a maroon settlement similar to those in other European colonies in the Americas, and the Spanish utilized the settlement as the first line of defence against outside incursions into Florida.

Fort Mose

Any fugitive slaves discovered by the Spanish were directed to head there. If they accepted Catholicism and were baptized with Christian names, and those capable served in the colonial militia, the Spanish treated them as free. The military leader at the fort, who had since 1726 been the appointed captain of the free black militia at St. Augustine, was a Mandinga born in the Gambia region of Africa, and baptized as Francisco Menéndez. He had been captured by slave traders and shipped across the Atlantic to the colony of Carolina, from where, he, like many other black enslaved persons, escaped and sought refuge in Spanish Florida. His status as a leader was solidified with the Spanish colonial authorities when he helped defend the city from a British attack led by John Palmer in 1728, and distinguished himself by his bravery. He was the de facto leader of the maroon community at Mose.

Fort Mose was the first free black settlement legally sanctioned in what would become the United States, and had a population of about 100. The village had a wall around it with dwellings inside, as well as a church and an earthen fort.

Word of the settlement of free blacks at Mose reached the British colonies of South Carolina and Georgia, and attracted escaping slaves. Fellow blacks and their Indian allies helped runaways flee southward to Florida. The Spanish colony needed skilled laborers, and the freedmen strengthened St. Augustine's military forces. In 1738 the Spanish governor established the runaways in their own fortified town (officially known as Gracia Real de Santa Teresa de Mose, but usually referred to simply as "Mose" in governmental documents of the period). This administrative action followed the example of colonial governments in the Caribbean, enabling the Spanish to hold and populate territory threatened by the Carolinians. The existence of Fort Mose is believed to have helped inspire the Stono Rebellion in September 1739. This was led by slaves who were "fresh from Africa". During the Stono revolt, several dozen Africans believed to be from the Kingdom of Kongo tried to reach Spanish Florida. Some were successful, and they rapidly adjusted to life there, as they were already baptized Catholics (Kongo was a Catholic nation) and spoke Portuguese.

As a military outpost, Mose defended the northern approach to St. Augustine, the capital of La Florida. Most of its inhabitants came originally from numerous different tribal and cultural groups in West Africa (predominately Kongos, Carabalis, and Mandinka) and had been sold into slavery in the colonies of North and South Carolina. While struggling to make their way to freedom in Florida, they had frequent interactions with many Native American peoples. By successfully defending their freedom and Spanish Florida in the mid-18th century, the black inhabitants of Fort Mose had a significant role in contemporary political conflicts between European colonial powers in the southeast.

The people of Mose made political alliances with the Spaniards along with their Indian allies, and took up arms against their former masters. Following the murder of some inhabitants at the fort by Indian allies of the British, Montiano ordered it abandoned and its inhabitants resettled in St. Augustine. The British later occupied the fort themselves.

The black militia fought beside Spanish regular soldiers against British forces under James Oglethorpe, who launched an attack on St. Augustine in 1740 during the War of Jenkins' Ear. During the ensuing conflict, a Floridian force consisting of Spanish troops, Indian auxiliaries, and free black militia counterattacked Oglethorpe's troops and defeated them, destroying the fort in the process. Oglethorpe was eventually forced to withdraw his forces back to Georgia, where the Black Spanish militia also participated in the unsuccessful Spanish counterattack in 1742.

By 1752, the Spanish had returned to and rebuilt Fort Mose, and the new governor forcibly relocated most of the free blacks back into the defensive settlement, from the more cosmopolitan, multilingual culture of St. Augustine.

After East Florida was ceded to the British in the 1763 Treaty of Paris, most of the free black inhabitants emigrated to Cuba with the evacuating Spanish settlers. At that time, the black population at St. Augustine and Fort Mose totaled about 3,000, of whom about three quarters were escaped slaves.

The British refurbished the fort after its evacuation by the Spanish, who later returned in 1784, once again using the fort as a military outpost. It was later occupied by the Florida Patriots, who sought to capture Florida for the newly established United States. An ambush by a Spanish and Indian alliance (again including black combatants) destroyed the fort for a final time in 1812.

Legacy 
A haven for refugee slaves mainly from South Carolina and Georgia, Fort Mose is considered the "premier site on the Florida Black Heritage Trail". The National Park Service highlights it as a precursor site of the Underground Railroad. This was the network in the antebellum years preceding the American Civil War by which slaves escaped to freedom, most often to the North and Canada, but also to the Bahamas and Mexico.

Modern identification and recovery of the site

The site was abandoned when Spanish Florida was ceded to British in 1763 Treaty of Paris, with the community being evacuated by the Spanish to Cuba. The empty site was demolished by the British in 1812, during the War of 1812. In 1968, motivated by the recent (1963–1964) racial violence in St. Augustine (see St. Augustine movement), Frederick Eugene "Jack" Williams, a long time St. Augustine resident, historian and amateur archaeologist, located the site from an old map, purchased the land, and began a campaign, supported by the Black Caucus in the Florida legislature, to have the site excavated.

From 1986 to 1988, a team of specialists, the Fort Mose Research Team—led by Kathleen Deagan of the Florida Museum of Natural History, Jane Landers, and John Marron of the University of Florida—performed an archaeological and historical investigation at Fort Mose. Their work revealed the site of the original fort, as well as the second facility constructed in 1752. Their discoveries showed that Africans played important roles in the geopolitical conflicts between European colonial powers in the southeast of what is now the United States.

Documents examined by historian Jane Landers in the colonial archives of Spain, Florida, Cuba, and South Carolina reveal who lived in Mose and some idea of what their lives were like in the settlement. In 1759 the village consisted of twenty-two palm thatched huts housing thirty-seven men, fifteen women, seven boys and eight girls. The people of Mose grew their own crops and their men stood guard at the fort or patrolled the frontier in service to the crown. They attended Mass in a wooden chapel where their priest also lived. Most of them married other refugees, but some married Indian women or slaves who lived in St. Augustine.

In the first year of excavating the archaeologists uncovered remains of fort structures, including its moat, clay-daubed earthen walls and the wooden structures inside the walls. They found a wide assortment of artifacts: military paraphernalia such as gunflints, lead shot, metal buckles and hardware; household items such as pipestems, thimbles, nails, ceramics, and bottle glass; and food remnants such as burnt seeds and bone.

Fort Mose's location on the small tidal channel called Mose Creek (Caño Mose) gave the Mose settlers access to the estuarine mud flats, oyster bars, salt marshes, and other tidal creeks of the North River, which joins the Matanzas River to form Matanzas Bay, St. Augustine's harbor. This tidal estuary was a rich source of food. Analysis of faunal remains found at the site by the team zooarchaeologist Elizabeth Reitz indicated that the Mose villagers had a diet very similar to that of the nearby Indian communities, with a heavy dependence on marine proteins and wild foods.

Facilities
Today, artifacts are displayed in the museum within the Visitor Center at the park. On the grounds, interpretive panels are used to illustrate the history of the site. Three replicas of historic items have been installed within the park: a choza or cooking hut, a small historic garden, and a small Spanish flat boat called a barca chata.

In popular media
The story of Fort Mose is told in a juvenile book published in 2010 by Deagan and Darcie MacMahon. It contains material not typically found in a children's book: an index, a long list of sources, internet resources, and documentation for all the illustrations. Landers has also written a full-length history of Spanish Florida, which covers Mose in detail.

Fort Mosé Bourbon 
In 2022, a Black-owned Fort Lauderdale distillery released Fort Mosé  Bourbon.

Gallery 
These panels are posted at the Visitor Center in Fort Mose Historic State Park.

See also

 Francisco Menéndez (black soldier)
 Negro Fort
 Siege of Fort Mose
 Siege of St. Augustine (1740)

References

External links

 Fort Mose Historic State Park at Florida State Parks
 Fort Mose Historical Society,
 History of Fort Mose, St. Augustine website
 St. Johns County listings, National Register of Historic Places
 St. Johns County listings, Florida's Office of Cultural and Historical Programs
 Fort Mose, National Park Service
 Fort Mose Site at The National Park Service – Links to the Past
 Fort Mose Historic State Park, Wildernet
 "Fort Mose: America's Black Colonial Fortress of Freedom", Florida Museum of Natural History
 Fort Mose – ThinkQuest
 "Fort Mose: A Legacy That Can Not Be Ignored",  Blacksonville.com

State parks of Florida
National Register of Historic Places in St. Johns County, Florida
National Historic Landmarks in Florida
Spanish Florida
Protected areas established in 1994
Parks in St. Johns County, Florida
Museums in St. Augustine, Florida
History museums in Florida
African-American museums in Florida
Mose
Spanish colonization of the Americas
Former populated places in St. Johns County, Florida
Mose
1738 establishments in the Spanish Empire
Populated places established by African Americans
Parks on the National Register of Historic Places in Florida
African-American history of Florida
Populated places on the Underground Railroad
Demolished buildings and structures in Florida
Archaeological sites in Florida
Fugitive American slaves